Vince Cotroneo is a radio play-by-play announcer for the Oakland Athletics.  He signed a two-year contract with the A's on January 13, 2006 to fill a void in the broadcast booth left by the sudden death of longtime lead announcer Bill King.  Number-two announcer Ken Korach would slide into King's old number-one slot, with Cotroneo serving as the number-two man.

Biography
Vince Cotroneo was born in Brooklyn, New York, and was raised in Orlando, Florida.  He attended the University of Central Florida, graduating in 1983 with a degree in Radio and Television. He is the father of up and coming play-by-play baseball announcer Dominic Cotroneo, the voice of Arizona State baseball and hockey.

Minor-League Broadcasting Timeline
1984: Worked for the Class A Lynchburg Mets (New York Mets organization – now defunct).

1985–1987: Announcer for the Class AA  El Paso Diablos (formerly Milwaukee Brewers organization).

1988: Spent one season with the AAA Iowa Cubs (Chicago Cubs organization), where he was named the National Association's Minor League Announcer of the Year.

1989–1990: Broadcaster for the Tucson Toros, at the time a Triple-A affiliate of the Houston Astros.  It was during this stint in the Pacific Coast League that he would meet his future Oakland broadcast partner, Ken Korach, at the time working for the Las Vegas Stars.

Major-League Broadcasting Timeline
Cotroneo was hired by the Houston Astros in 1991, and remained with them through 1997, calling the action alongside Hall-of-Famer Milo Hamilton.  In 1998, he moved upstate to Arlington, where he called the action for the  Texas Rangers for six years, teaming with Eric Nadel on the radio side.  After the 2003 season, Rangers president Michael Cramer elected not to renew Cotroneo's contract.

After spending two seasons out of baseball, Cotroneo submitted a sample of his work to A's Vice President of Broadcasting and Communications, Ken Pries.  In December, Pries interviewed Cotroneo, and the following month, made the decision to hire him.

Bibliography
2006 Oakland Athletics Media Guide. Pg. 409. Produced by the Oakland Athletics Public Relations Department.

References

External links
Athletics Nation: Meet Vince Cotroneo
Scout.com: Q&A with A's Broadcaster Vince Cotroneo, Part 1

American radio sports announcers
Houston Astros announcers
Living people
Major League Baseball broadcasters
Minor League Baseball broadcasters
Oakland Athletics announcers
Sportspeople from Brooklyn
Sportspeople from Orlando, Florida
Texas Rangers (baseball) announcers
University of Central Florida alumni
Year of birth missing (living people)